District 29 is a district of the Georgia State Senate. It comprises most of Troup County (including LaGrange), half of Columbus-Muscogee, and all of Harris and Meriwether.

Senators
 J. Render Hill (1965–1984)
 A. Quillian Baldwin, Jr. (1984–1992)
 Steve Langford (1992–1998)
 Dan Lee (D, then R) (1998–2004)
 Seth Harp (R) (2004–2010)
 Josh McKoon (R) (2010–2018)
 Randy Robertson (R) (2018–present)

Georgia Senate districts